The 2005 season was SK Brann's 97th season as a club and their 19th consecutive season in the Norwegian Premier League.
The year started with a 2-0 loss to Malmø in Royal League 2004-2005, and the Norwegian league opened with a win 2-0 home at Brann Stadion over Molde, in a match best remembered by Paul Scharners efforts for Brann even though his wife was expecting a baby at any minute. Paul Scharner scored and was appointed Man of the match - his daughter was born the following day. On October 29 Brann finished the season with a draw against Ham-Kam and finished 6th in the Premier League. After the season finished Scharner was named Player of the year. The Norwegian cup ended by being eliminated by Vålerenga at Ullevaal Stadion in the Quarterfinals. After the season ended in October construction work started in The Clock End at Brann stadion, where a new stand was built during the winter.

Squad

 
 
 
 (C)

Results

References 

2005
Brann
SK